The Volkswagen Concept A was a concept car created by German automobile manufacturer Volkswagen. It was introduced at the 2006 Geneva Motor Show. The Concept A is a cross between a coupé and a crossover sports utility vehicle.

Description
The Concept A was powered by an I4 twincharger (TSI) engine with around 150 horsepower. It has all-wheel drive (AWD) with 4Motion and six gears with automatic transmission. The car's design was sporty but rugged. It is sometimes claimed as a cross between a coupé and a crossover sports utility vehicle because of this styling and design.

A production version of the Concept A, the Tiguan Compact SUV, was expected for sale in the end of 2008. It was launched at the end of 2007 at the Frankfurt Motor Show.

References

All-wheel-drive vehicles
Cars introduced in 2006
Compact sport utility vehicles
Crossover sport utility vehicles
Concept A